Judith Ann Clingan  (born 19 January 1945) is an Australian composer, conductor, performer and music educator. Since 1997, she has been the Director of Wayfarers Australia (formerly Waldorf Wayfarers) Australia Wide Choir.

Early life
Clingan was born on 19 January 1945, in Sydney, New South Wales to Victor Lawrence Clingan and Marian Dorothy Tasker. She was educated at Hornsby Girls' High School, the University of Sydney, the University of New South Wales and the Australian National University (ANU).

Clingan moved to Canberra with her family in 1963, and graduated from the ANU in 1966. In 1967 she founded the Canberra Children's Choir and began composing music for SSA voices. She studied voice, bassoon and composition at the Canberra School of Music (now ANU School of Music) She studied music education at the Zoltan Kodaly Pedagogical Institute of Music in Kecskemet (Hungary) from 1981–1982.

Career
In 1969 she founded the Summer Music Schools for Children, known as the Young Music Society prior to 1975. In 1983 she founded Gaudeamus Music and Performing Arts (now Music For Canberra) in 1983. She was the director of Gaudeamus for eleven years and during this time she remained a composer, writing choral and music theatre works for the group to perform. In 1990 members of Gaudeamus performed her music theatre work Kakadu at the International Society of Music Educators conference in Finland.

In 1991 she began her involvement in Steiner education and since then has written many short choral and music theatre pieces for Steiner students.

Clingan founded Voicebox Youth Opera when working in South Australia from 1994–1996, and directed the Canberra branch of Voicebox from 1997 - 2002. She composed many music theatre pieces during this time. In 1994 she founded Imagine Music Theatre.

In 1997 she founded the choir Wayfarers Australia and the Canberra vocal group The Variables.

She has been the recipient of many awards, fellowships and grants, including in 1986 a Membership of the Order of Australia for services to music, Churchill Fellowship, Australia Council Composer Fellowship, ANU Creative Arts Fellowship, artsACT Creative Artists Fellowship, Canberra Times Artist of the Year, Sounds Australian award for her composition Kakadu, funding from the Australia Council, Arts ACT and Arts SA, commissions for original compositions and numerous residencies in Australia.

Clingan is currently the director of Wayfarers Australia and Imagine Music Theatre.

Selected works
Puer natus = The boy that is born : liturgical drama for Christmas, 1968
A Canticle of light, 1976
The Lorax (words: Dr. Seuss), 1979
Lux Mundi, 1985
Rime of the Ancient Mariner (with Stephanos Malikides), 1985
Peter Pandemonium (based on J. M. Barrie's story), 1985
Modal magic : seven songs for a cappella children's choir, 1986
Francis, or Singing is believing: a mini-opera in three acts, 1986
Ngambra : a Canberra canticle (libretto: Anthony Hill), 1988
Terra beata - terra infirma, 1989
Seven Deadly Sins, 1990
Kakadu (words: Marian Clingan), 1990
Birds' Noel, 1990
Marco : an opera for young people based on the travels of Marco Polo, 1990
Songs of solitude, 1991
Mass of hope, 1992
Mythical beasts, 1992
Stony tunes, 1994
A Pawn in the Game, 1995
Birth pangs : for women's choir (words: David Adam), 1996
Moomin Magic (based on Finn Family Moomintroll by Tove Jansson), 1999
The Grandfather Clock (based on a book by Tony Hill), 2001
Spiritus Sanctus Australis, 2001–2002
A Lake for Canberra, 2017, commissioned for carillon by the Australian National University and the National Capital Authority
The Threshold, 2023, New music theatre looking at Ageing and the End of Life

References

External links
Wayfarers Australia
So Good a Thing - Judy Clingan remembers fifty years of music in Canberra
Canberra Choral Society
Canberra Gay and Lesbian Qwire
Music For Canberra

1945 births
Living people
20th-century classical composers
20th-century conductors (music)
20th-century women composers
21st-century classical composers
21st-century conductors (music)
21st-century women composers
Australian classical composers
Australian conductors (music)
Australian women classical composers
Composers for carillon
Members of the Order of Australia
University of New South Wales alumni
Women conductors (music)